Mobile Suit Gundam: Crossfire, known in Japan and Europe as , is a PlayStation 3 launch title, published and developed by Namco Bandai Games, based on Sunrise's Mobile Suit Gundam franchise. It was released in Japan on November 11, 2006, and in North America on November 17, 2006, and in Europe on March 23, 2007.

Plot

Mobile Suit Gundam: Crossfire Takes place during the One Year War, UC 0079,  with all missions being based in the eastern half of the world from Africa to Australia after the Federations GM production increase in October.

Reception

The game has received generally poor critical reception.

Japanese video game magazine Famitsu was the first to review this game, giving it a 32 out of 40 with each panelist rating it an 8 out of 10.

On the day of the PlayStation 3 launch in Japan, Crossfire sold 33,000 units. The American release was not nearly as well received as the Japanese release. IGN gave the game a 3.2 out of 10, GameSpot rated it 3.9 out of 10, 1UP gave it a score of 2 out of 10, and Game Informer gave the game a 3.75 out of 10. OPM gave Crossfire a 3 out of 10. MAHQ, a dedicated mecha anime website, gave it 1.5 out of 5. PSM gave the game a 5 out of 10. GamePro gave it a 1.0 out of 5.0. X-Play gave it a 1 out of 5 for "being shovelware of the highest order".  Problems cited by reviewers included bland, outdated graphics, an underdeveloped story, bad voice acting, clumsy gameplay, and a slew of technical issues including (but not limited to) constant framerate issues, collision bugs, and frequent malfunctions of allied and even enemy AI.

References

External links
Official Mobile Suit Gundam: Crossfire website 
Mobile Suit Gundam: Crossfire at Metacritic
IGN coverage
MAHQ Mobile Suit Index

2006 video games
Action video games
Bandai Namco games
Gundam video games
Video games about mecha
PlayStation 3-only games
PlayStation 3 games
Video games developed in Japan
Video games scored by Hideyuki Fukasawa